KWS may stand for:

 Kawasaki Station, JR East station code
 Kenny Wayne Shepherd, American blues guitarist
 Kenya Wildlife Service
 KWS (band)
 KWS (album), the band's eponymous 1992 album
 Keynesian Welfare State
 KWS (Kuno Wildlife Sanctuary)
 KingsWay School, an Integrated Christian School in Orewa, New Zealand.
 KWS Saat, a German plant breeding company